Tadashi Hamada is a fictional character who appears in Walt Disney Animation Studios' 54th animated feature, Big Hero 6. The film is inspired by a Marvel comic book of the same name. He is voiced by Daniel Henney. In addition, Tadashi is ethnically Japanese. In the film, Tadashi, a student at the San Fransokyo Institute of Technology, is the creator of Baymax, and the older brother of Hiro Hamada. Baymax, as described in the film, is a personal health care companion.

Appearances

Big Hero 6 (2014)
Tadashi appears in Big Hero 6 as Hiro Hamada's older brother. Due to their parents being deceased, Tadashi is Hiro's primary voice of reason and father figure. In the film, Tadashi and Hiro live in San Fransokyo with their aunt Cass. Although his age is not explicitly described in the film, Tadashi acts very mature for his age. Additionally, Henney describes the character as "pure", even comparing Tadashi to an angel. Tadashi is also a "tech-wizard" who attends the San Fransokyo Institute of Technology, where he conceives, builds and programs Baymax.
 

In the film, Tadashi suggests that Hiro should attend the San Fransokyo Institute of Technology as Hiro is also gifted in robotics and engineering, even more so than Tadashi, his intellect allowing him to graduate from high school at 13. Initially, Hiro dismisses the request, as he chooses to pursue monetary gain from his domination in illegal bot fights in San Fransokyo, even in spite of any risks. Tadashi responds to this by redirecting his little brother's intelligence, taking Hiro with him on a quick trip to his college. From it, Hiro sees just how remarkable the institution really is, and is introduced to Tadashi's friends—Honey Lemon, GoGo, Wasabi, and Fred. Tadashi also introduces Hiro to his project Baymax, a personal healthcare robot. Tadashi designs Baymax to have a huggable build. The film's animation team researched at Carnegie Mellon University to help conceive Baymax's design. Directors Don Hall and Chris Williams wanted Baymax to be "appealing but also huggable." Ryan Potter (Hiro's voice actor) states that Hiro sees Baymax as a representation of Tadashi. The experience inspires Hiro to want to attend the school himself, and, with a small amount of help from Tadashi, he begins working on his own endeavor in order to gain admission. Hiro showcases his project, Microbots, controlled by a neurological headband and highly versatile, at a student exhibition held at the school. Shortly after being accepted by Robert Callaghan, the institute's professor, the exhibition hall catches fire. With Professor Callaghan still inside, Tadashi runs into the burning building in an effort to save him. Moments later, the building explodes, killing Tadashi and as everyone else assumes, Callaghan. Hiro, Baymax, and Tadashi's school friends mourn Tadashi throughout the rest of the film, while most of his legacy remains present in the form of Baymax. Following Tadashi's death, Baymax ends up taking over the role of being Hiro's emotional support. A series of further events leads to the formation of a group who helps Hiro investigate Tadashi's death and the criminal plot that surrounds it: this same group would go on to honor Tadashi's wisdom and dedication of helping people, through becoming the superhero team that would call themselves Big Hero 6. Prior to the film's climax, Baymax shows video footage of his testing by Tadashi to Hiro, revealing it took Tadashi several dozen attempts to perfect Baymax's original programming, body, and their compatibility with each other. Portions of these tests are seen in the second official US trailer of the film.

Korean version
In the Korean version of the film, Tadashi's name, which is of Japanese origin, is changed to "Teddy".

Big Hero 6: The Series
Tadashi briefly appears, as a recording, in the first episode "Baymax Returns". It is revealed that he taught Hiro how to ride a bike. Henney reprised his role. He also appears in "Obake Yashiki" where he appears as an illusion created by augmented reality that made Hiro to believe that Tadashi is alive. The series gives more insight into how he created Baymax. In "Failure Mode", it is revealed that he nearly gave up on completing him and he needed a medical expert named Lily in order to properly program him, as seen in "City of Monsters – Part I". In the season 2 finale "Legacies", Hiro accepts Tadashi's diploma on his behalf at graduation.

Printed media
Tadashi appears in the prequel manga, Baymax, which was released prior to the film's release, in August 2014. Unlike other Disney properties that received a one-shot manga, Baymax is a full manga story which had the goal of previewing the film's story. Tadashi also appears in other Disney books, such as The Art of Big Hero 6, and Big Hero 6: Hiro and Tadashi.

Reception
A review by Manohla Dargis of The New York Times describes that Tadashi "isn't much better" than the "disappointingly bland maternal creation," Aunt Cass. In her review, Dargis states that this is despite Tadashi being a "hunky brainiac who studies at an institute of higher nerdiness alongside a Scooby Doo-like posse." The Japan Times describes that Tadashi "fits the normal Hollywood bill of a polite young Japanese male". At one point in his review, Sam Adams of Indiewires "Criticwire" blog, writes that Tadashi has a "nurturing spirit". Adams also criticizes Tadashi's death, calling it "underplayed and unseen". After mentioning another blogger's interpretation of why Hiro didn't want to lose Baymax, Adams writes that, "Even in retrospect, Tadashi's death isn't rendered significant."

In other media
The character is alluded in Avengers: Age of Ultron. While looking for a replacement AI, Tony Stark looks through several other AIs; one is labeled Tadashi and another is Jocasta but both were passed over for F.R.I.D.A.Y.

References

Big Hero 6 characters
Film characters introduced in 2014
Fictional college students
Fictional mechanical engineers
Fictional inventors
Fictional roboticists
Superhero film characters
Teenage characters in animated films
Fictional Japanese American people
Animated characters introduced in 2014